Adrian Battiston (born 16 September 1963) is a former Australian rules footballer who played with Melbourne and the Sydney Swans in the Victorian Football League (VFL).

Battiston, who came to Melbourne from Tatura, won the Morrish Medal in 1981 for his performances in the VFL Under 19 competition. This earned him a promotion to the seniors in 1982 and he played in all 22 league games that year, winning Melbourne's "Best First Year Player" award. He was the leading disposal getter for Melbourne in the 1985 VFL season.

His two seasons at Sydney were spent mostly in the reserves, and in 1990 he moved to his third state, South Australia, to play for Glenelg. He made 23 appearances for the club and would later act as their general manager.
Battiston was the List Manager for the West Coast Eagles, and is now part of the R&D Sports Management Group.

References

External links
 DemonWiki profile

1963 births
Australian rules footballers from Victoria (Australia)
Melbourne Football Club players
Sydney Swans players
Glenelg Football Club players
Tatura Football Club players
Living people